Kammatipaadam, alternatively spelled as Kammatti Paadam, is a 2016 Indian Malayalam-language action drama film directed by Rajeev Ravi and written by P. Balachandran. The film stars Dulquer Salmaan, Vinayakan, Shaun Romy, Manikandan R. Achari, Vinay Forrt, Shine Tom Chacko, and Suraj Venjaramoodu. The songs were composed by K, John P. Varkey and Vinayakan  while the background score was composed by K.

The film centers on Kammattippaadam, a slum locality in Kochi, Kerala. It focuses on how the Dalit community was forced to give up their lands to real-estate mafias and how modern urbanisation of Kochi metro-city took place over the plight of the Dalits.
The film won four awards at the 47th Kerala State Film Awards, including Best Actor, Best Supporting Actor, Best Art Director and Best Film Editing. It has been listed by several publications as one of the best Malayalam films of the decade and a defining movie of the New Wave Movement.

Plot
Krishnan, who works in a security firm in Mumbai, receives a call from his childhood friend Ganga. The call indicates that Ganga is in danger and needs Krishnan's help. Later, Krishnan travels to Kerala to find Ganga. During his journey, Krishnan recalls the memories of his hometown Kammattippaadam.

In the early 1980s, Krishnan, a primary school student befriends  Gangadharan/Ganga,  a kid who belongs to a Dalit family. Ganga's brother Balan/Balan Chettan is a thug and is involved in smuggling spirit. Both Krishnan and Ganga are introduced to violence at a very young age. Krishnan is in love with Anitha, a relative of Ganga (Anitha is Ganga's bride as per custom).

Krishnan, Ganga, Balan Chettan, Venu and others form a gang working for a local real estate conman named Surendran Aashaan. After the gang is involved in a fight, Krishnan kills a police officer while trying to save Ganga. He then goes to jail and returns to Kammattippaadam only to discover that the gang is now more advanced and are smuggling spirit under the leadership of Surendran Aashaan. The gang creates a lot of enemies, which includes Johnny. Krishnan discovers that Ganga is also in love with Anitha and is planning to get married soon. The gang threatens the local people to leave their homes at low price. Ganga's grandfather is devastated at his grandchildrens' involvement in it and he dies grief-stricken at their disrespect.

Balan who is now a changed man after his grandfather's death wants to stop everything. One night Balan's wife demands to go to medical shop to get some supplies. They are accompanied by both Ganga and Krishnan. Balan Chettan says that he wants to stop his criminal activity and simply wants to live happily with his family in Kammattippaadam by starting a travel agency. During their conversation about Anitha, Balan mentions his wish to see Krishnan marry her and this causes Ganga and Balan to end up in a fight. Ganga gets out of the car. Later, Balan, Krishnan and Balan's wife Rosamma reach the nearby medical shop. Rosamma and Krishnan get out of the car and walk towards the medical shop. Balan, too intoxicated stays in the car which moments later gets hit by a truck, explodes and leaves Balan Chettan dead. Ganga blames Krishnan for his brother's death and both their friendship is torn apart.

Later, Krishnan starts a travel agency and Ganga still remains a thug. The gang later hanging out in a bar, a discussion cracks out among the gang members, one among them asks whether Krishnan remembers how much he has vomited while coming back from a trip at Alappuzha & he says the stain of Krishnan's vomit is still persistent on the bathroom wall, meanwhile they meet a friend Sumesh & the discussion turns to be serious when they learn that Johnny was the one who planned Balan's murder. An enraged Krishnan and Ganga stab Johnny, landing them in trouble, chased by the police. Krishnan gets arrested saving Ganga. Meanwhile, Ganga marries Anitha and then Krishnan relocates to Mumbai.

In the present, Krishnan learns about the mishaps created by Ganga and tries to find him with the help of Rosamma. Rosamma reveals that it could be Johnny who is behind Ganga's problems and Krishnan sets on a journey to find Johnny. Johnny who is paralysed after Ganga stabbing him says that he is not aware of Ganga's whereabouts. Krishnan beats down all of Johnny's gang members but the fight ends with Krishnan getting stabbed by Johnny's brother Sunny.

Later, Krishnan is left heartbroken when he hears that Ganga's dead body has been found. He later seeks the help of Aashaan who is now a big business entrepreneur to find the real killer only to discover that he is the one who murdered Ganga. Aashaan reveals that he killed Ganga due to his constant disturbance and demands for money. Aashaan is killed by Krishnan kicking him out the window of his high storey apartment built on the swamps on Kammattippaadam.

Cast

 Dulquer Salmaan as Krishnan
 Vinayakan as Gangadharan
 Shaun Romy as Anitha (voice over by Srinda Arhaan )
 Manikandan R Achari as Balakrishnan/Balan Chettan
 Vinay Forrt as Venu
 Shine Tom Chacko as Johnny
 Anil Nedumangad as Surendran aka Aashaan
 Amalda Liz as Rosamma
 P. Balachandran as Krishnan's father
 Rasika Dugal as Juhi
 Suraj Venjarammood as Sumesh
 Alencier Ley Lopez as Mathai
 Anjali Aneesh as Krishnan's mother
 Muthumani as Krishnan's sister
 Sreekanth Chandran as Martin (Police Officer)
 Shane Nigam as Sunny, Johnny's brother 
 Ganapathi as Charlie
 Vijay Kumar as Paranki Majeed
 Soubin Shahir as Karate Biju (extended cameo)
Sidharth Rajendran as Thola Benny.
Divya Gopinath as Paranki Majeed's wife
Shalu Rahim as young Krishnan
Vishnu raghu as Abu

Sudarshan Appangad as Achachan

Background
Ernakulam was a small town during the early 1950s, and during the first communist government of EMS Namboodiripad in 1957, small tracts of farm land were given to all landless community, mainly to the Dalit community, under the Land Reforms Ordinance Act. But in the later years, Ernakulam boomed into a metro city, and real estate skyrocketed. The swamps and paddy fields were converted to housing boards, luxury villas and apartments.

Kammatipadam shows how the Dalits were forced by their own brethren (depicted in the film as Balan Chettan and gang) to sell out their lands to the real estate mafia, of which the members were born among them (represented by Surendran aka Aashaan in the film). It is an irony that Balan Chettan and Gangadharan who work as goons of the mafia themselves are grandsons of a staunch Communist grandfather (Achachan in the film). Father of Gangadharan is also depicted as strong believer of Communism, who reads only Deshabhimani, the official Communist daily. By the time Balan and the gang understood the reality, literally, they lost the ground under their feet and even their lives. Dalits had no right over the lands through generations, but when they got it, their own next generation's irresponsible and uncivil deeds, despite the warning from elders, led to losing those rights. The events in the movie show how undesirable events unfold within a community that does not understand the meaning of liberty and lacks unity and civility. Because of the rude deeds of few uncivil minds in their own community, the history of Dalits repeats, as most of them lose their lands and existence itself. Although the film upholds intercaste friendship and marriage values, the main characters' lives are depicted to be wasted due to their irresponsible and impulsive behaviour.

Rajeev Ravi wrote in an article in Deshabhimani few days after the release of the movie that the word ‘Pulayan’ was not allowed to be used even once in the movie by the Censor Board.

Production
The film started production in September 2015 in Mumbai. The title Kammattipaadam was announced in February 2016. The filming was completed on 10 March 2016 and the release was scheduled for May 2016. A one-minute twenty five second long trailer of film was released on 16 May in YouTube.

Soundtrack 
The soundtrack features songs composed by three composers, namely K, John P. Varkey and Vinayakan. The background score was composed by K.

Release and reception
Kammatipaadam released in theatres on May 20, 2016. The DVDs and VCDs of the film were released on 10 August 2016.

Critical reception
Anurag Kashyap has stated that Kammatipaadam is one of the best gangster movies ever made in India. He also appreciated the brilliant performance of actors in the movie.

Gowtham VS of The Indian Express wrote: "Rajiv Ravi has dismantled all conventional concepts of Malayali aesthetics by capturing the unadulterated beauty of black skin through characters who portrayed the lives of Dalits. The director has continued to use his anarchic concepts of visualisation, which include shaky shots, blurred frames and sometimes abrupt sequences. The realistic and daring approach of Rajiv Ravi deserves standing ovation at times when the paper tigers in this industry still fear to come up with something different from the old mould." A critic from Indiaglitz.com described it as "one classy movie which needs to be applauded for its passion and intensity".

Box office
It collected  from all over India in its first week. The film collected around  within 12 days from all India box office. The film collected  during its third weekend in the U.S. market.

Awards 
 Kerala State Film Awards (2016)

 Best Actor – Vinayakan
 Best Character Actor – Manikandan R. Achari
 Best Film Editor – B. Ajithkumar
 Best Art Director – Gokuldas N. V., S. Nagaraj

 Filmfare Awards South (2017)

 Won, Critics Award for Best Actor – Dulquer Salmaan
 Won, Best Supporting Actor – Vinayakan
 Nominated, Best Film – Kammatipaadam
 Nominated, Best Director – Rajeev Ravi
 Nominated, Best Lyricist – Anwar Ali for "Para Para"

 South Indian International Movie Awards (2016)

 Won, Best Film – Kammatipaadam
 Nominated, Best Director – Rajeev Ravi
 Nominated, Best Actor in a Supporting Role – Vinayakan
 Nominated, Best Debut Actor – Manikandan R. Achari
 Nominated, Best Lyricist – Anwar Ali for "Puzhu Pulikal"

 IIFA Utsavam (2017)
 Won, Best Performance In A Supporting Role - Male – Vinayakan
 Nominated, Best Picture – Kammatipaadam
 Nominated, Best Direction – Rajeev Ravi
 Nominated, Best Story – Rajeev Ravi
 Nominated, Best Performance In A Negative Role – Anil Nedumangad
 Nominated, Best Music Direction – John P. Varkey
 Nominated, Best Lyrics – Anwar Ali for "Para Para"

References

External links
 

2016 films
2016 action drama films
Indian action drama films
Films about friendship
Films about missing people
Films set in Mumbai
Films shot in Mumbai
Films set in Kerala
Films scored by K (composer)
2010s Malayalam-language films
Films scored by John P. Varkey
Films scored by Vinayakan